Changes Two is an album by Charles Mingus. It was recorded on 27, 28, and 30 December 1974 at Atlantic Studios in New York City—the same sessions which resulted in Mingus's album Changes One. Atlantic Records initially released the record; In 1993, it was issued on CD by Rhino Records.

The brief version of "Duke Ellington's Sound of Love" features vocals by Jackie Paris.

Track listing 
All compositions by Charles Mingus except where noted.

 "Free Cell Block F, 'Tis Nazi U.S.A." – 6:56
 "Orange Was the Color of Her Dress, Then Silk Blue" – 17:32
 "Black Bats and Poles" (Jack Walrath) – 6:22
 "Duke Ellington's Sound of Love" – 4:15
 "For Harry Carney" (Sy Johnson) – 7:59

Personnel 
 Charles Mingus – acoustic bass 
 Jack Walrath – trumpet
 George Adams – tenor saxophone
 Don Pullen – piano
 Dannie Richmond – drums
 Marcus Belgrave – trumpet ("Duke Ellington's Sound of Love")
 Jackie Paris – vocals ("Duke Ellington's Sound of Love")
 Sy Johnson – arranger ("Duke Ellington's Sound of Love")

Technical personnel 
 Nesuhi Ertegun – engineer, executive producer
 David Gahr – photos
 Nat Hentoff – liner notes
 İlhan Mimaroğlu – producer, remixing
 Gene Paul – engineer, remastering
 Paula Scher – cover design
 Bobby Warner – remixed

References 

Charles Mingus albums
1975 albums
Atlantic Records albums
Rhino Records albums